The fourth season of the long-running Australian medical drama All Saints began airing on 13 February 2001 and concluded on 27 November 2001 with a total of 43 episodes.

Plot 
The year begins with a heatwave tearing through Sydney during bushfire season throwing everything into jeopardy. Ben and his new partner Scott have time to bond when they are trapped in the truck, while Terri decides to take some well deserved leave when Rose warns her to stay away from Mitch. The new NUM, Kate Larsen causes problems as her alcoholism spins out of control. Upon her return, Terri realises things have changed. Former ward clerk Tony is admitted to hospital, suspected of being on drugs. Connor and Jodi's relationship continues to develop until a positive pregnancy test throws a spanner - and people's opinions - into the works. After a ghostly visit from his late wife Stephanie, Ben finally realises it's time to move on with former ambo partner, Bron. Terri developed and unlikely romance with medical registrar, Dr. Malcolm Pussle Von encounters a young leukaemia patient and builds and unlikely friendship. Jared's professional life and his relationship with Kylie becomes rocky when he begins taking speed to help him during exams. Luke's liaison with Claudia, the hospital's CEO comes to a climatic end but all hope for his lovelife is not lost when nurse Paula Morgan is hired as a permanent member of staff on Ward 17. As the year draws to a close, the All Saints staff must say goodbye to one of their beloved nurses. Lives are left hanging in the balance in the explosive season finale that will send shockwaves through the Ward, the hospital and ultimately, their lives.

Cast

Main 
 Georgie Parker as Terri Sullivan (33 episodes)
 Conrad Coleby as Scott Zinenko (42 episodes)
 Jeremy Cumpston as Connor Costello (episodes 1–33)
 Martin Lynes as Luke Forlano (42 episodes)
 Judith McGrath as Von Ryan
 Libby Tanner as Bronwyn Craig
 Ben Tari as Jared Levine
 Erik Thomson as Mitch Stevens
 Brian Vriends as Ben Markham

Recurring 
 Ling-Hsueh Tang as Kylie Preece (26 episodes)
 Joy Smithers as Rose Stevens (21 episodes)
 Belinda Emmett as Jodi Horner (15 episodes)
 Brett Climo as Malcolm Pussle (14 episodes)
 Sonia Todd as Kate Larsen (10 episodes)
 Jane Hampson as Glenys Fell (10 episodes)
 Josh Quong Tart as Matt Horner (8 episodes)
 Alex Jones as Lyle Slater (8 episodes)
 Natasha Beaumont as Rebecca Green (6 episodes)
 Jenni Baird as Paula Morgan (3 episodes)

Guest 
 Rachel Gordon as Claudia MacKenzie (8 episodes)
 Christopher Pitman as Rick Forlano (6 episodes)
 Ivar Kants as Dr. Richard Bird (5 episodes)
 Luciano Martucci as Dominic Turner (4 episodes)
 Valerie Bader as Julie Costello (3 episodes)
 Jake Blundell as Tony Hurst (1 episode)
 Robert Coleby as Prof. Richard Craig (1 episode)
 Kirrily White as Stephanie Markham (1 episode)
 Paul Tassone as Nelson Curtis (1 episode)
 Dawn Fraser as herself (1 episode)
 Simon Pryce as Ambo Brad (1 episode)

Episodes

Weakest Link Special Episode 
On 26 November 2001, a special episode of The Weakest Link featuring the actors from All Saints went to air. The results were as follows:

Note that the following are regarding the contestant, not the contestant the contestant votes against:
 Red indicates the contestant was the weakest link
 Lime indicates the contestant was the strongest link

1 Josh and Ling tied with three votes each, but as Erik was the strongest link, he opted to vote Josh off.

2 Georgie and Judith tied with three votes each, but as Joy was the strongest link, she opted to vote Georgie off, though she originally voted for Judith.

3 Each player received one vote, but as Erik was the strongest link, he opted to vote Ben off.

Conrad was first eliminated for annoying everyone. Josh was next on a countback also for annoying everyone. Georgie followed for getting too many votes in previous rounds. Judith was voted out for not answering enough questions correctly. Joy was eliminated for not banking any money nor answering enough questions correctly. Marty was next also for not answering enough questions correctly. Ben was voted out on a countback for not banking anything nor answering enough questions correctly. In the end, Erik defeated Ling in the head-to-head round.

The final total won was $43,200, which Erik donated to Care Australia.

DVD release

References

General
 Zuk, T. All Saints Series 4 episode guide, Australian Television Information Archive. Retrieved 15 July 2008.
 TV.com editors. All Saints Episode Guide - Season 4, TV.com. Retrieved 15 July 2008.

Specific

All Saints (TV series) seasons
2001 Australian television seasons